Geeta  Colony Assembly constituency was an assembly constituency of the East Delhi (Lok Sabha constituency), New Delhi, India from 1967 to 2008.

Formation
The constituency was created pursuant to "Delimitation Order, 1967". Its first election was held in 1972 and it was assigned identification number 25.The history behind the name taken from BHAGVAT GEETA which have 18 chapters so Geeta Colony have total 18 blocks accordingly.

Extinguishment
The constituency ceased to exist in 2008 after the "Delimitation of Parliamentary and Assembly Constituencies Order, 2008" was passed.

Area covered
The Geeta Colony Assembly constituency was delineated by a line starting from the junction of Gandhi Nagar Road with Yamuna and running eastwards along Gandhi Nagar Road up to its junction with the eastern boundary of Krishna Nagar, thence along the eastern and southern boundary of Krishna Nagar and along the southern boundary of Geeta Colony up to the Canal Bund; thence westwards along the Canal Bund up to Yamuna; thence north-westwards along Yamuna back to the starting point.

See also
East Delhi (Lok Sabha constituency)
New Delhi

References 

Former assembly constituencies of Delhi
North East Delhi district
New Delhi